Theloderma asperum is a frog in the family Rhacophoridae. It is also known as the pied warty frog, hill garden bug-eyed frog, or somewhat informally, bird poop frog. The frog can be found in the northeastern India, Burma, China (Tibet, possibly more widely), Thailand, Cambodia, and Vietnam as well as Sumatra in Indonesia. However, because of confusion with Theloderma albopunctatum and Theloderma baibungense, it is known with certainty from its type locality in Peninsular Malaysia.

Description

It is a small frog, reaching no more than 3 centimeters long. The main color of the frog is red-brown.  The sides of the frog are mud-white with red spots.  The frog has dark red eyes.

Habitat
Theloderma asperum is a tree bark mimic that breeds in tree holes.

References

External links
Bird poop frog!

asperum
Amphibians of Cambodia
Amphibians of China
Frogs of India
Amphibians of Indonesia
Amphibians of Laos
Amphibians of Malaysia
Amphibians of Myanmar
Amphibians of Thailand
Amphibians of Vietnam
Amphibians described in 1886
Taxa named by George Albert Boulenger